Dayes is a surname. Notable people with the surname include:

Edward Dayes (1763–1804), English watercolour painter and engraver
Hylton Dayes (born 1964), men's soccer coach at the University of Cincinnati
Matthew Dayes (born 1994), American football player

See also
Day-Lewis